Al-Sultan Yoosuf Kalaminjaa I Sri Bavanaadheehtha Mahaa Radun (Dhivehi: އައްސުލްޠާން ޔޫސުފު ކަލަމިންޖާ އެއްވަނަ ސިރީ ބަވަނާދީއްތަ މަހާރަދުން) was the son of Audha and younger brother of Sultan Hali II. As his brother Sultan Hali II was childless, he succeeded him after his death on 1288. He died in the year 1294 after ruling for six years.

1294 deaths
13th-century sultans of the Maldives
Year of birth unknown